Thap Thiang Subdistrict is a tambon (sub-district) of Mueang Trang District, Trang Province regarded as the administrative center of the province. Thap Thiang has an area of 14.77 km2 (round about 5.70 mi2) and a population of 59,637 people in 2017.

Geography
Neighboring tambons are (from the north clockwise): Na Ta Luang, Ban Pho, Khok Lo, Bang Rak.

History
Thap Thiang has a history of more than 100 years. Its name means 'rest at noon' as King Chulalongkorn (Rama V) had traveled here and rested in the pavilion at noon. Later in 1915, the capital district of Trang moved from Kantang to here.

However, according to historical scrutiny. It was found that King Chulalongkorn never came to Thap Thiang. Therefore, it is believed the name "Thap Thiang" probably means a break for cooking or eating lunch during the noon of the traders who came to trade in the past.

Originally, it was called Tai Phru (ท้ายพรุ), later after the year 1938, the name was changed to Thap Thiang. There are important permanent structures such as Trang Clock Tower, Trang Provincial Hall, Trang Governor's Residence, Dugong Circle, Krapang Surin Public Park, Trang Railway Station, Thumrin Thana Hotel, Trang Hospital.

Administration
The tambon is administered by the city municipality (Thesaban Nakhon) Trang (เทศบาลนครตรัง)

Notable people
Chuan Leekpai: two times Prime Minister
Chiranan Pitpreecha: S.E.A. Write Award poet

References

Tambon of Trang Province